The first season of the American  reality competition series Ultimate Beastmaster premiered exclusively via Netflix's web streaming service on February 24, 2017. The show consists of 10 Beastmaster episodes which were released simultaneously on Netflix worldwide. The show was filmed in Santa Clarita, California, over the course of eight nights.

Olympic gold-medal swimmer Ed Moses competed in the second episode, Going for Gold, coming in second place.

Hosts
In addition to Sylvester Stallone hosting the series, each country has their own set of two hosts/commentators for the competition. They are as follows:

Not only do each pair of hosts provide color commentary for each of the six localized versions, but the foreign commentators also make appearances in each localized version, with their commentary presented by subtitles. If a contestant completes a course, all hosts' reactions are shown on screen. Furthermore, since all host booths are placed in a row on the Ultimate Beastmaster set, commentators from one localization can easily walk into the booth of another localized version.

The Beast
The obstacle course for the competition is known as The Beast, and it is divided into 4 Levels. Competitors with the highest scores after each level move on while those with the lowest scores are eliminated. Scores accumulate on levels 1–3, with ties decided in favor of the competitor with the lowest time. The obstacles are suspended over a body of red-tinted water referred to as Beast Blood and housed in a giant steel frame that takes the form of a large animal. A competitor is considered to have failed a Level if all four limbs are submerged into the Beast Blood. Failure ends the attempt at the current Level, but confers no penalties; except in the case of Level 3's The Hard Way, in which completing additional challenges nets bonus points but failure removes points.

The winner of each episode is crowned the title Beastmaster. The nine beastmasters of all episodes then compete against each other in the final episode (episode 10). The winner, if completed the entire level 4 (reaching the top of The Power Source and obtained the final Point Thruster at the summit), is crowned the Ultimate Beastmaster and awarded $50,000.

Level 1
In Level 1 all twelve competitors compete with the top eight scorers moving on. 
 The Heart breaker - Competitors must cross a series of parallel horizontal bars.
 Mother Tongue - Competitors must scale a 30 ft plank at a 45° angle with no grips, then jump onto a small climbing wall mounted above the ramp and successfully climb onto the ledge.
 Brain Matter - Competitors cross a 16" wide (reduced to 6" for the finals) suspended balance beam with the aid of a small gear handle above their head. The first Points Thruster is located midway along Brain Matter.
 Throat Erosion - Replacing Mother Tongue and  Brain Matter in certain episodes, competitors must use an industrial trampoline to jump and grab a lever releasing a climbing wall.
 Faceplant - Competitors stand on a narrow platform, hands braced against panels on either side, as they are tilted forward to a 45° angle. They must then jump to a rope (sometimes a chain) and swing to the next obstacle.
 Energy Coils -  Competitors must jump across a series of 8 semi-stationary hanging platform at various heights. The second (first if competitors faced Throat Erosion instead of Brain Matter) Point Thruster is located next to a side platform.
 Mag Wall - Competitors navigate horizontally across a climbing wall. Periodically the magnetic handholds are released and fall to the Beast's blood. The wall features an inversion, from which the competitors must jump to the finishing platform. A third and final Point Thruster was added toward the end of Mag Wall during the finals.
Each portion of an obstacle is worth 5 points

Level 2

In Level 2 the top eight competitors compete, with the top five scorers moving on. 
 Spinal Ascent - Competitors must complete a series of vertical jumps, with the largest being 8 feet. Three platforms are fixed, while two are suspended.
 Spinal Descent - Competitors must work their way down through a cable web, the cables becoming thinner and thinner toward the bottom. A Point Thruster is located at the bottom.
 Stomach Churn - Competitors must traverse three spinning platforms all at varying heights.
 Digestive Track - Jumping from the last spinning platform into a tube, competitors must climb the tube before it sinks and jump to the next obstacle.
 Dreadmills - Competitors must cross a pair of suspended treadmills and leap to a platform. 
 Chain Reaction - Competitors must swing across a series of hanging chains. A Point Thruster is located midway across.
 Vertebrace - Competitors must hop through a series of five suspended vertebrae-shaped hoops and jump to the finish platform. A Point Thruster is located at the left of the second vertebrae.
Each portion of an obstacle is worth 5 points

Level 3 (Energy Pyramid)
In Level 3, also known as the Energy Pyramid, the top 5 scorers compete, with the top two advancing to the final level.
 The Ejector - Competitors must mount a 14 MPH forward-moving treadmill and attempt to grab a suspended rope handle (attached to Prism Strike). 
 Prism Strike - Competitors must hold onto the rope handle as it swings through a curved track. A Points Thruster is located to the side of the track roughly midway through.
 The Coil Crawl - Competitors must work their way through a tube structure made of pipe and chain before it sinks into the water. 
At the end of the Coil Crawl competitors must make a choice between two paths.
If competitors choose to go right (The Easy Way) they only have to complete one more obstacle:
 The Extractor - Competitors must climb a series of hanging poles to reach a high platform.
If competitors choose to go left (The Hard Way) they have a chance to do three bonus obstacles:
 Bungee Beds - Competitors must traverse three unstable platforms suspended at varying heights by bungee chords. This obstacle has mats beneath, and a competitor fails if any part of their body touches the mat.
 Tricky Trapeze - Competitors must use their momentum to swing across three trapeze bars. The first bar is held magnetically in place and will instantly release upon being grabbed. The next two bars are suspended on a pulley which enables them to shift from side-to-side further making traversing them far harder.
 Weapon - Competitors must use grip handles to slide across 2 sets of v-shaped bars. The first set descends to the second set. The competitor then must jump to the finishing platform.
Obstacles (excluding those on the bonus course) are worth 10 points. Bonus obstacles are worth 20 points each, and a competitor may choose to accept their bonus score and decline the remaining obstacle(s). Failure on any of the bonus obstacles forfeits any bonus points and suffers a 20-point penalty.

Level 4 (The Power Source)
In Level 4 all scores are reset to 0 and the top 2 competitors face each other on The Power Source, an eighty-foot climbing wall, with the top 1 being the Ultimate Beastmaster for the finals.
 Foundation - Competitors navigate a wall of increasingly small handholds.
 Grid Lock - Instead of handholds, competitors must climb using 2-inch-wide slots cut into the surface in a grid-like pattern.
 Ventilator - Competitors must ascend a narrow vertical crevice.
 High Voltage - Competitors face a sheer vertical surface with only two extremely narrow ledges. 
There is a final Point Thruster at the summit of The Power Source.

Along all four sections of the Power Source are Energy Taps, green buttons which the competitors must touch in order to gain points. Each Energy Tap is worth ten points, except the 2 energy Taps from High Voltage which are worth 40 points. Competitors are given six minutes to accumulate the highest possible score, with ties decided in favor of the competitor who is currently highest on the tower. There is no failure condition for the Power Source, and competitors may attempt to regain their footing if they lose grip on the tower/wall or fall.

Episodes
 The contestant was named Beastmaster.
 The contestants completed that level.
 The contestant was eliminated on that round.

Episode 1: Beast Nation
Competitors
 Heeyong Park, 34 Ice Climber - Team South Korea - Beastmaster Simon Brunner, 18 College Student - Team Germany - Eliminated on Level 4
 Ricardo de Oliviera, 24 Parkour Instructor - Team Brazil - Eliminated on Level 3
 Omar Zamitiz, 36 Rehab Trainer - Team Mexico - Eliminated on Level 3
 Matias Chavez Jimenez, 29 Parkour Athlete - Team Mexico - Eliminated on Level 3
 Markus Ertelt, 37 Actor - Team Germany - Eliminated on Level 2
 Shaun Provost, 26 Obstacle Course Racer - Team USA - Eliminated on Level 2
 Shinobi Poli, 31 Parkour Teacher - Team USA - Eliminated on Level 2
 Toyohiko Kubota, 40 Sports School Owner - Team Japan - Eliminated on Level 1
 Takehide Sato, 34 Crossfit Coach - Team Japan - Eliminated on Level 1
 Myon Tuk Han, 33 Fitness Model - Team South Korea - Eliminated on Level 1
 Karine Abrahim, 31 Hairdresser - Team Brazil - Eliminated on Level 1

Level 1

A perfect run will give you a score of 80 points.

Level 2

Level 3

Level 4

Episode 2: Going for Gold
Competitors
 David Manthei, 20 Architecture Student - Team Germany - Beastmaster Ed Moses, 35 Olympic Swimmer - Team USA - Eliminated on Level 4
 Jinbong Lee, 29 Former Special Forces - Team South Korea - Eliminated on Level 3
 Johannes Gmelin, 33 Crossfit Gym Owner - Team Brazil - Eliminated on Level 3
 Koohun Lee, 32 Crossfit Athlete - Team South Korea - Eliminated on Level 3
 Angelica "Wild Rabbit" Melo, 20 Communications Student - Team Mexico - Eliminated on Level 2
 Jacobo Luchtan, 26 Technology Firm COO - Team Mexico - Eliminated on Level 2
 Shoji Nakayama, 37 Comedian - Team Japan - Eliminated on Level 2
 Hanah Jamroz, 21 Online Personal Trainer - Team USA - Eliminated on Level 1
 Marcel Tratnik, 34 Lifeguard - Team Germany - Eliminated on Level 1
 Yoshifumi Fujita, 28 Strongman - Team Japan - Eliminated on Level 1
 Simone de Araujo, 34 Capoeira Instructor - Team Brazil - Eliminated on Level 1

Level 1

Level 2

Level 3

Level 4

Episode 3: The Beast Evolves

 Competitors 
 Steven Tucker, 29 Rock Climbing Instructor - Team USA - Beastmaster Emmanuel Chiang, 22 Law Student - Team Mexico - Eliminated on Level 4
 Marcel Scarpim, 33 Engineer - Team Brazil - Eliminated on Level 3
 Ryan Scott, 32 Financial Advisor - Team USA - Eliminated on Level 3
 Fernando Casanova, 37 Musician - Team Mexico - Eliminated on Level 3
 Taeyoung Lee, 29 Stunt Director - Team South Korea - Eliminated on Level 2
 Joel Pusitzky, 26 Professional Model - Team Germany - Eliminated on Level 2
 Maki Morishima, 32 Pole Dancer - Team Japan - Eliminated on Level 2
 Carol Valim, 33 Circus Performer - Team Brazil - Eliminated on Level 1
 Kyoung Duck Kang, 33 Personal Trainer - Team South Korea - Eliminated on Level 1
 Hiroyuki Tanaka, 25 Tech Consultant - Team Japan - Eliminated on Level 1
 Kerstin Schoessler, 33 Sport Scientist - Team Germany - Eliminated on Level 1

 Level 1 

 Level 2 

 Level 3 

 Level 4 

Episode 4: The Legend vs. The Beast
Competitors
 Philip Meyer, 23 Soldier - Team Germany - Beastmaster 
 Taeho Kwon, 31 Actor and Fitness Model - Team South Korea - Eliminated on Level 4 
 Marcel Stevanin, 25 Parkour Athlete - Team Brazil - Eliminated on Level 3 
 Eduardo Oliveira, 33 PE Teacher, Team Brazil - Eliminated on Level 3 
 Yuji Urushihara, 37 Shoes Salesman/Sasuke Legend - Team Japan - Eliminated on Level 3 
 Jonas Kegelmann, 19 Parkour Instructor - Team Germany - Eliminated on Level 2 
 Jalil Al Akabani, 29 Store Owner - Team Mexico - Eliminated on Level 2 
 Jongsuk Kim, 26 Personal Trainer - Team South Korea - Eliminated on Level 2 
 Juan Bernardo, 30 Criminal Lawyer - Team USA - Eliminated on Level 1 
 Yuriko Santander, 32 Electrical Engineer - Team Mexico - Eliminated on Level 1 
 Cortni Joyner, 30 Professional Soccer Player - Team USA - Eliminated on Level 1 
 Yuki Fukumoto, 25 Professional Dancer - Team Japan - Eliminated on Level 1

Level 1

 Level 2 

 Level 3 

 Level 4 

Episode 5: The Battle of Wills

 Competitors 
 Roberto Perez, 25 Chemical Engineering Student - Team Mexico - Beastmaster Charles Robinson, 25 Retired Marine - Team USA - Eliminated on Level 4
 Philipp Hell, 25 Software Developer - Team Germany - Eliminated on Level 3
 Alfredo Bermudes, 34 Acrobat - Team Brazil - Eliminated on Level 3
 Tomomichi Shiozaki, 28 Firefighter - Team Japan - Eliminated on Level 3
 Satoshi Mashito, 38 Arm Wrestler - Team Japan - Eliminated on Level 2
 Chico Salgado, 33 Martial Arts Instructor - Team Brazil - Eliminated on Level 2
 Todd Wise, 29 Crossfit Gym Owner - Team USA - Eliminated on Level 2
 Gundam Kim, 35 Personal Trainer - Team South Korea - Eliminated on Level 1
 Georgina "Gina" Castillo, 34 Single Mom - Team Mexico - Eliminated on Level 1
 Sungsoon Chang, 30 Swim Trainer - Team South Korea - Eliminated on Level 1
 Michael Pela, 26 Lawyer - Team Germany - Eliminated on Level 1

 Level 1 

 Level 2 

 Level 3 

 Level 4 

Episode 6: Beauty Meets the Beast

 Competitors 
 Hyunho Kim, 30 Crossfit trainer - South Korea - Beastmaster Santiago López, 29 Wine Maker - Mexico - Eliminated on Level 4
 Trevor Carter, 32 Firefighter -  United States - Eliminated on Level 3
 Silke Sollfrank, 18 Student - Germany - Eliminated on Level 3
 Akio Shimofuji, 29 Office employee - Japan - Eliminated on Level 3
 Phelipe Young, 25 Circus acrobat - Brazil - Eliminated on Level 2
 Marco Cerullo, 27 Bartender - Germany - Eliminated on Level 2
 Daesung Oh, 31 Personal Trainer -  South Korea - Eliminated on Level 2
 Guilherme Medeiros, 35 Special police (BOPE) - Brazil - Eliminated on Level 1
 Júlio Códova, 28 Jiu Jitsu fighter - Mexico - Eliminated on Level 1
 Eiji Semba, 28 Personal Trainer - Japan - Eliminated on Level 1
 Lindsay Andrew, 33 Crossfit athlete - United States - Eliminated on Level 1

 Level 1 

 Level 2 

 Level 3 

 Level 4 

Episode 7: Beast Mode

 Competitors 
 Felipe Camargo, 24 Professional Climber - Team Brazil - BeastmasterCompleted Level 4 in 5:09
 Ludwig Hefele, 18 Physics Student - Team Germany - Eliminated on Level 4
 César Curti, 29 Mahamudra Instructor - Team Brazil - Eliminated on Level 3
 Ivan Zepeda, 20 Cheerleader - Team Mexico - Eliminated on Level 3
 Chang Suk Bang, 35 Former Special Forces - Team South Korea - Eliminated on Level 3
 Woochul Kim, 34 Basketball Player - Team South Korea - Eliminated on Level 2
 Steffen Zimmermann, 25 Psychologist - Team Germany - Eliminated on Level 2
 Daigo Nakano, 28 Physiotherapist - Team Japan - Eliminated on Level 2
 Kaori Sakai, 30 Service representative - Team Japan - Eliminated on Level 1
 Thaily Amezcua, 37 Novel Actress - Team Mexico - Eliminated on Level 1
 Mimi Bonny, 31 Entrepreneur - Team USA - Eliminated on Level 1
 Brandon Douglass, 27 Parkour Athlete - Team USA - Eliminated on Level 1

 Level 1 

 Level 2 

 Level 3 

 Level 4 

Episode 8: Brother vs. Brother
Competitors
 Jonathan Collins, 33 Track Coach and Model - Team USA - Beastmaster Yungyung Kim, 20 Gymnast - Team South Korea - Eliminated on Level 4
 Tabito Okayasu, 29 Actor - Team Japan - Eliminated on Level 3
 Adrien Ngouah-Ngally, 19 Mover and Student - Team Germany - Eliminated on Level 3
 Yoshitaro Fujiwara, 27 Professional Trainer - Team Japan - Eliminated on Level 3
 Adrian Raya, 31 Frontenis Player - Team Mexico - Eliminated on Level 2
 Yunhwan Kim, 22 Gymnast - Team South Korea - Eliminated on Level 2
 Marcelo Munhoz, 23 Triathlon Athlete - Team Brazil - Eliminated on Level 2
 Rafael Picolo, 31 Surf Instructor - Team Brazil - Eliminated on Level 1
 Julia Habitzreither, 30 Medical Student - Team Germany - Eliminated on Level 1
 Isaiah Stanback, 31 Ex NFL Player - Team USA - Eliminated on Level 1
 Claudia Lopez, 33 Lawyer - Team Mexico - Eliminated on Level 1

Level 1

Level 2

Level 3

Level 4

Episode 9: The Last Call
Competitors
 Ken Corigliano, 35 Air Force Major - Team USA - Beastmaster Nam Vo, 25 Mechanical Engineering Student - Team Germany - Eliminated on Level 4
 Bruno Nogueira, 30 US Army Veteran - Team Brazil - Eliminated on Level 3
 Brian Redard, 30 Personal Trainer - Team USA - Eliminated on Level 3
 Taeyoon Kim, 26 Parkour Coach - Team Korea - Eliminated on Level 3
 Mitsuteru Tanaka, 28 Muscleman Entertainer - Team Japan - Eliminated on Level 2
 Woosung Yu, 35 Mixed Martial Arts Fighter - Team Korea - Eliminated on Level 2
 Keita Omura, 29 Jiu Jitsu Champion - Team Japan - Eliminated on Level 2
 Alexander Schmidt, 24 Professional Acrobat - Team Germany - Eliminated on Level 1
 Abe Green, 32 Graphic Designer - Team Mexico - Eliminated on Level 1
 Amancay Gonzalez, 26 Athletic Spokesperson - Team Mexico - Eliminated on Level 1
 Mirella Araujo, 39 Dancer - Team Brazil - Eliminated on Level 1

Level 1

Level 2

Level 3

Level 4

Episode 10: Season 1 Finale
Competitors
 Felipe Camargo, 24 Professional Climber - Team Brazil - Ultimate Beastmaster'6:47
 Jonathan Collins, 33 Track Coach and Model - Team USA - Eliminated on Level 3
 Roberto Perez, 25 Chemical Engineering Student - Team Mexico - Eliminated on Level 2
 Hyunho Kim, 30 Crossfit Trainer - Team Korea - Eliminated on Level 2
 Steven Tucker, 29 Rock Climbing Instructor - Team USA - Eliminated on Level 1
 David Manthei, 20 Architecture Student - Team Germany - Eliminated on Level 1
 Phillip Meyer, 23 Soldier - Team Germany - Eliminated on Level 1
 Heeyong Park, 34 Ice Climber - Team Korea - Eliminated on Level 4
6:49
 Ken Corigliano, 35 Air Force Major'' - Team USA - Eliminated on Level 2 with injury

Level 1

Level 2

Level 3

Level 4

Extra Episodes

Broadcast
The show has six country-specific versions. These have separate hosts, and languages, with two competitors from each country competing in each of the first nine episodes of the series. The countries are the U.S., Brazil, South Korea, Mexico, Germany, and Japan.

The hosts for the show are Terry Crews and Charissa Thompson (U.S.); Anderson Silva and Rafinha Bastos (Brazil); Seo Kyung Suk and Park Kyeong Rim (South Korea); Ines Sainz and Luis Ernesto Franco (Mexico); Hans Sarpei and Luke Mockridge (Germany); and Sayaka Akimoto and Yuji Kondo (Japan).

References

2017 American television seasons